Soennecken is a German office products manufacturer. Its products are well known in the United Kingdom, North America, Australia and also India. Founded by Friedrich Soennecken in 1875, the name was registered as a trademark in 1905. Soennecken is the synonym for the development of the pen, binder and the punch. Due to bankruptcy, the trademark is owned by the BRANION EG since 1973. Today the enterprise offers a variety of office products.

Timeline
 1883: Soennecken employs 30 workers and packman, acquisition of area from Poppelsdorf, now Bonn
 1887: Extension of the factory
 1896: A new building is inaugurated
 1898: New building for furniture production
 1903/1904: Completion furniture factory Soenneckenfeld
 1909: New building in Poppelsdorf: Soenneckenfeld
 1910: Participation at the World's Fair Brussels with awards
 1911: Soenneckens son, Alfred Soennecken is active in the company
 Purchase of Shannon Zeiss registration department company Berlin
 1913 export branches in Berlin, Leipzig, Amsterdam, Antwerp and Paris
 72,000 goods packages are sent into all world
 Purchase of the feather/spring factory Schaper in Iserlohn
 1919: Death of Friedrich Soennecken
 1920s: Enterprise employs approx. 1000 coworkers
 1973: Bankruptcy
 1983: BRANION EG buys the exclusive trademark rights

External links

 
 pictures of historical punch, penholder and advertising of the company Soennecken

References 

Defunct companies of Germany
German brands
Companies established in 1875
1875 establishments in Germany